Clare Murphy Pleuler (born December 20, 1993) is an American professional soccer player who plays as a defender for Real Sociedad.

College career
Pleuler started her career at Boston University Terriers.

References

External links
Profile at Real Sociedad

1993 births
Living people
Women's association football defenders
American women's soccer players
Soccer players from Massachusetts
Sportspeople from Gloucester, Massachusetts
ŽFK Spartak Subotica players
F.C. Ramat HaSharon players
AC Sparta Praha (women) players
UD Granadilla Tenerife players
Real Sociedad (women) players
Primera División (women) players
American expatriate women's soccer players
Expatriate women's footballers in Serbia
Expatriate women's footballers in the Czech Republic
Expatriate women's footballers in Israel
Expatriate women's footballers in Spain
American expatriate sportspeople in Sweden
American expatriate sportspeople in Spain
21st-century American women
Boston University Terriers women's soccer players
American expatriate sportspeople in the Czech Republic
Czech Women's First League players